Andrea Peron (born 28 October 1988) is an Italian professional road racing cyclist, who currently rides for UCI ProTeam .

At the age of sixteen, Peron was diagnosed with type 1 diabetes. Born in Camposampiero, Veneto, Peron currently resides in Borgoricco, Veneto, Italy.

Major results
Sources:

2013
 8th Route Adélie
2014
 8th Trofeo Palma
2015
 9th Vuelta a La Rioja
2017
 10th Overall Tour of Estonia
2019
 8th Overall Tour of Estonia

References

External links

Cycling Base: Andrea Peron

Team Novo Nordisk: Andrea Peron

Italian male cyclists
Living people
Cyclists from the Province of Padua
1988 births
People with type 1 diabetes
20th-century Italian people
21st-century Italian people